Renegotiations: The Remixes is the first extended play (EP) by American group the Black Eyed Peas. It was released on March 21, 2006, by A&M Records, Interscope Records and will.i.am Music Group. The EP includes alternative versions of non-single tracks from the group's fourth studio album Monkey Business (2005).

Critical reception

Renegotiations: The Remixes received generally favorable reviews from music critics. John Bush from AllMusic praised the EP: "If these [remixes] had appeared on Monkey Business, the album would have been (setting aside "My Humps" and "Don't Phunk with My Heart") one of the best rap records of the year. Perhaps it's better this way, with the pop productions sequestered on Monkey Business and this tight EP the perfect choice for hip-hop fans." J-23 from HipHopDX was also positive towards the EP but was critical of some tracks due to their original versions: "Despite not being able to overcome shortcomings that come via Monkey Business, this EP is dope in places and is at least very respectable in its efforts." Adrian Ruhi from Okayplayer commended the EP, claiming it served as "a statement that they still have their hip-hop sensibilities, despite the fact that some of the originally poppy tracks sound a bit awkward when remixed by old school producers."

Track listing

Notes
 signifies a co-producer
 signifies a remix producer

Charts

Certifications

Release history

References

External links
 Official website
 

2006 remix albums
2006 debut EPs
Albums produced by DJ Premier
Albums produced by Erick Sermon
Albums produced by Large Professor
Albums produced by Pete Rock
Albums produced by will.i.am
Remix EPs
Interscope Records remix albums
Interscope Records EPs
Black Eyed Peas albums